A Town Called Panic is a 2009 internationally co-produced stop-motion animated adventure fantasy comedy film directed by Stéphane Aubier and Vincent Patar from a screenplay co-written by Aubier, Patar, Guillaume Malandrin and Vincent Tavier. The film is based on the French-language Belgian series of the same name and stars Aubier, Jeanne Balibar, Nicolas Buysse, Véronique Dumont, Bruce Ellison, Frédéric Jannin, Bouli Lanners, and Patar, among others.

It premiered at the 2009 Cannes Film Festival and was the first stop-motion film to be screened at the festival. The film was released theatrically in Belgium on 17 June 2009 by Cinéart and in France on 28 October 2009 by Gébéka Films. The film received generally positive reviews from film critics.

Plot
Friends Cowboy, Indian, and Horse live in a rural house together peacefully. Cowboy and Indian forget Horse's birthday, and come up with the idea of building him a brick barbecue. Not wanting Horse to find out they forgot, they get him out of the house by convincing their neighbor Steven to ask Horse to pick his animals up from the nearby music school. There, Horse meets his love interest, Mrs. Jacqueline Longray, a fellow horse who is also a music teacher. When he attempts to play piano for her, she offers to give him lessons.

Back at the house, Indian attempts to order the fifty bricks needed for the grill, but Cowboy accidentally orders fifty million. They get rid of the excess bricks by building them into a cube and putting them on top of the house, then build the grill. That night, the house collapses under the weight of the bricks. Irate, Horse makes Cowboy and Indian help rebuild the house. When they try to put up the walls, an unknown figure continues to steal them. When staking out the house to find the culprits, the trio discover the walls are being stolen by a family of aquatic creatures whose heads are shaped like cones. All but one of them escape with the wall. They chase the straggler, Gerard, off of a cliff, where they fall into the earth's core. Gerard escapes.

Climbing out, they find themselves in the middle of a tundra. While wandering throughout, they are sucked into a giant penguin robot that is being used by incomprehensible, super-strong scientists to make and throw giant snowballs. They catch up with Gerard, but they are all subsequently captured and put to work by the scientists. While the scientists battle a rogue mammoth, the group escapes by setting a snowball to launch at the house and climbing into it. At the last second, Gerard sets it for his home under the sea.

Gerard swims off when the snowball lands and the three give chase, donning scuba masks (Cowboy simply puts a TV on his head) and swimming after him. They find an underwater version of their house, revealing Gerard and his family wanted the walls to build their own house. The creatures chase the trio off with a group of barracudas, but they come back and trick the creatures into a hole by Horse posing as Santa Claus. They use a sawfish to destroy their house and escape to the surface, but the creatures follow them and attack with swordfish. Steven, his wife, and his animals help fight back. In the process, Steven's house explodes with water and the countryside is flooded.

One year later, Gerard's family is an accepted part of the community, and Horse is now a skilled piano player and dating Longray, who throws a surprise birthday party for him in an underwater department store. Cowboy and Indian accidentally set off Horse's birthday present, a giant firework, causing a giant fireworks display that destroys the landscape as the credits roll.

Cast
Stéphane Aubier as (Cowboy, Max Briquenet, Mr Ernotte)
Jeanne Balibar as (Madame Jacqueline Longrée; spelled "Longray" in some English subtitles)
Nicolas Buysse as (Sheep, Jean-Paul)
François De Brigode as (Sportscaster)
Véronique Dumont as (Janine)
Bruce Ellison as (Indian)
Christine Grulois as (Cow, Student)
Frédéric Jannin as (Policeman, Gérard, Brick Delivery Man)
Bouli Lanners as (Postman, Simon, Cow)
Christelle Mahy as (Chicken)
Éric Muller as (Rocky Gaufres, Music Student 1)
François Neyken as (Pig)
Vincent Patar as (Horse, Mother Atlante)
Pipou as (Michel's laugh)
Franco Piscopo as (Bear)
Benoît Poelvoorde as (Steven)
David Ricci as (Donkey, Michel)
Ben Tesseur as (Scientist 1)
Alexandre von Sivers as (Scientist 2)

Production
The film was made over the course of 260 days in a studio on the outskirts of Brussels. 1500 plastic toy figures were used during filming.

Release
The film premiered at the 2009 Cannes Film Festival on 21 May 2009 and was released theatrically on 17 June 2009 in Belgium by Cinéart and on 28 October 2009 in France by Gébéka Films. It was also released on DVD on 20 July 2010 by Zeitgeist Video.

Critical response

The film received generally positive reviews, with the review aggregator Rotten Tomatoes reporting an 81% approval rating based on 80 critics, and an average rating of 7.1/10. The website's critical consensus states, "A Town Called Panic is a raucous, endlessly creative animated romp with a quirky, adult sense of humor." On Metacritic, the film has a weighted average score of 70 out of 100, based on 20 critics, indicating "generally favorable reviews".

Little White Lies gave the film 4 out of 5 for enjoyment stating "wide-eyed, broad smile" although in retrospect they scored the film 3 out of 5 suggesting that "like all toys. It will have a shelf life". Empire magazine were very positive awarding the film 4 stars, summing it up as "Toy Story on absinthe" and stating the film was "One of the year's true originals." Peter Brunette of The Hollywood Reporter was also positive summarizing that "There's really very little to say about this film beyond that it's absolutely brilliant." Roger Ebert enjoyed the film, giving it three-and-a-half out of four stars and stating that "Because the plot is just one doggoned thing after another without the slightest logic, there's no need to watch it all the way through at one sitting. If you watch it a chapter or two at a time, it should hold up nicely." Ebert later placed the film on his list of the best animated films of 2010.

Accolades
Official Selection (Out of Competition), 2009 Cannes Film Festival.
Official Selection, 2009 Toronto Film Festival.
Winner, Audience Award, 2009 Fantastic Fest.
Winner, Best Sound, 2011 Magritte Awards
Winner, Best Production Design, 2011 Magritte Awards

References

External links

A Town Called Panic at Twitter
A Town Called Panic at Facebook

2009 films
2000s adventure comedy films
2009 animated films
Belgian animated films
2000s French-language films
French animated films
2000s French animated films
Luxembourgian animated films
2000s stop-motion animated films
2009 comedy films
French-language Belgian films